Dean Channel is the upper end of one of the longest inlets of the British Columbia Coast,  from its head at the mouth of the Kimsquit River.

History
Dean Channel was named by Captain Vancouver in 1793 after Rev. James King, Dean of Raphoe, Ireland. The channel was surveyed by Captain Richards in 1861 of HMS Hecate. It is located within the Central Coast region.

Branches
Ending at the mouth of Cousins Inlet, which is the harbour for the abandoned town of Ocean Falls, the fjord's name changes to Fisher Channel down the west side of King Island. Fitz Hugh Sound passes on the inside of Calvert Island and opens onto Queen Charlotte Sound just northwest of the opening of Queen Charlotte Strait.

Opening onto Fitz Hugh Sound in its lower reaches near Queen Charlotte Sound is Rivers Inlet, home of the Wuikinuxv (Owekeeno) First Nations. The total length of the fjord from the head of Dean Channel to the mouth of Fitz Hugh Sound is about  rivalling Hardangerfjord in Norway for length.  If the additional lengths of South Bentinck Arm and North Bentinck Arm, plus Burke Channel and its shorter companion, Labouchere Channel, and an arm of Burke named Kwatna Inlet were factored in, total length of the fjord complex's waterways is  - longer than Sognefjord's  and rivalling Greenland's Scoresby Sound's .

North Bentinck Arm

A side-inlet of Burke Channel, North Bentinck Arm, is noteworthy as the place where the overland expedition by fur trade explorer Alexander Mackenzie reached the sea, on July 20, 1793. Wanting to see the open ocean, Mackenzie and four Nuxalk people went by canoe the next day to Dean Channel. Mackenzie did not reach the open ocean, stopping at the ruins of an old Heiltsuk village on the north side of Dean Channel. There he wrote his name on a rock, which today is part of Sir Alexander Mackenzie Provincial Park. Mackenzie did not know that he arrived just a few weeks after Captain George Vancouver visited Dean Channel and North Bentinck Arm.

The town of Bella Coola is at the head of North Bentinck Arm; Bella Coola is an English adaptation of the Heiltsuk name for the Nuxalk (whose name in their own language means the Bella Coola River and its valley).  Bella Coola is the only community on the coast between Vancouver and Kitimat, to have road access to the rest of the province, via British Columbia Highway 20 to Williams Lake via the Chilcotin region.

References

Fjords of British Columbia
History of British Columbia
Central Coast of British Columbia
Channels of British Columbia